The year 1907 in archaeology:

Explorations
 Theodor Makridi Bey makes brief explorations at Alaca Höyük.

Excavations
 January 6 – Tomb KV55 (almost certainly that of Akhenaten, 18th Dynasty) in Egypt's Valley of the Kings is discovered by Edward R. Ayrton.
 March – Ludwig Borchardt begins excavating the Pyramid of Sahure in Egypt.
 William M. Ramsay and Gertrude Bell work in Turkey.
 John Garstang begins work at Sakçagözü (continues to 1912).
 Ernst Sellin begins work at Tell es-Sultan, Jericho.
 Arthur Acton begins work at the Roman legionary works depot at Holt, Wales.
 British School at Athens begins excavations in Ritsona.

Finds
 March – Aurel Stein discovers the Diamond Sūtra, a woodblock printed Buddhist scripture dated 868, at the Mogao Caves, near Dunhuang; it is "the earliest complete survival of a dated printed book".
 October 21 – Jaw of Homo heidelbergensis (Mauer 1) found.
 Medieval frescos uncovered in Fulltofta Church, Sweden.
 Lady of Auxerre located in a storeroom of the Louvre.

Publications
 First publication of Lokrume helmet fragment, the earliest record of a Viking Age helmet.
 E. A. Wallis Budge – The Egyptian Sudan: its History and Monuments.
 Aleš Hrdlička – Skeletal Remains Suggesting or Attributed to Early Man in North America.

Miscellaneous
 March 11 – Chaco Canyon National Monument is established.
 Lukis Museum opens on Guernsey.
 Howard Carter begins to work for Lord Carnarvon to supervise his excavations in Egypt.

Births
 July 28 – Grahame Clark, English archaeologist (died 1995).
 July 29 – Aileen Fox, English archaeologist (died 2005).
 August 30 – Bertha "Birdie" Parker, Native American archaeologist (died 1978).

Deaths

References

Archaeology
Archaeology
Archaeology by year